Balige is a town in North Sumatra province of Indonesia and it is the seat (capital) of Toba Regency. It is 240 kilometers away from Medan. Balige is also a tourist spot to see Lake Toba, the largest crater lake in South East Asia. Balige is 60 kilometers away from Parapat, another tourism town around Lake Toba.

Climate
Balige has an elevation moderated tropical rainforest climate (Af) with moderate rainfall from June to August and heavy rainfall in the remaining months.

References

Populated places in North Sumatra
Regency seats of North Sumatra